Dax O'Callaghan (born 2 July 1982 in London, England) is an English singer, dancer and actor.

Dancing and acting

O'Callaghan trained at the Sylvia Young Theatre School in London. O'Callaghan started working professionally at a young age featuring in many television commercials whilst still a child at school. Aged 10 he ventured into Musical Theatre where he played the lead role Gavroche in London's West End musical Les Misérables at the Palace Theatre.

He appeared on television in EastEnders as Jack Price, Casualty, Hope and Glory, Trial by Jury and The Knock. Leaving school at 16, O'Callaghan went on to host Laugh Out Loud for Nickelodeon.

As a trained dancer an early dance career also emerged whilst at school, performing with The Spice Girls, SugaBabes, PJ & Duncan, TV show Live & Kicking, and the fashion company The Production Team in his early teens. When leaving school he went on to join world choreographer Wayne Sleep on the production of DASH as a featured dancer.

After a later career as a recording artists, O'Callaghan returned to the UK in 2010 from living in Los Angeles and began choreographing for other artists.

O'Callaghan has been a guest judge for the European and International ASDU Dance Championships, and also the UDO World Street Dance Championships.

Singing career

At 19 O'Callaghan signed as a solo recording artist with Warner International Record Company. His single "Calling Love" was successful in some European charts, particularly in France.

In 2006, he then signed with Universal Records becoming one of five members in the new boyband Lexington Bridge, a mixed American-British act, that had success in Europe. They released one album, The Vibe and three singles, namely "Kick Back", "Real Man" featuring Snoop Dogg and "Dance with Me". The band split in 2010.

In 2008, O'Callaghan became choreographer for Germany's reality TV Show Popstars, working with the winning group named Room 2012.

From 2011 to 2015 O'Callaghan collaborated with Kensington Temple, London City Church, working to bring a modern style with music and stage performance and production within the UK Church.

Music production
O'Callaghan has worked as a music producer for artists such as Kelly Rowland, JLS, Pixie Lott, Little Mix and Alexandra Burke, designing and remixing their music for TV performances and Arena tours. He has produced and designed music for fashion shows as well as award shows.

In 2011 he released his first UK single called "Broken", fronted by ex-EastEnders actor Mohammed George, which featured Dax O'Callaghan as well as being written by him. The song was co-produced with Jay-F (John Farmer) through a label they set up together for the UK release named 'D&J Music'. The song was used as an anthem for the Ben Kinsella Trust and all royalties from sales were donated to the charity helping the fight against knife crime within the UK.

External links

1982 births
English male soap opera actors
Living people
Male actors from London
Alumni of the Sylvia Young Theatre School